Scaleby is a civil parish in the Carlisle district of Cumbria, England.  It contains 16 buildings that are recorded in the National Heritage List for England.  Of these, one is listed at Grade I, the highest of the three grades, and the others are at Grade II, the lowest grade.  The parish contains the village of Scaleby, and is otherwise rural.  The most important building in the parish is Scaleby Castle; this and associated structures are listed.  The other listed buildings include houses, farmhouses and farm buildings, a church, a former chapel, a church hall, a war memorial, and a milestone.


Key

Buildings

Notes and references

Notes

Citations

Sources

Lists of listed buildings in Cumbria
Listed buildings